The 1998 Superbike World Championship was the eleventh FIM Superbike World Championship season. The season started on 22 March at Phillip Island and finished on 4 October at Sugo after 12 rounds.

The season saw the introduction of a revised qualifying system: after two timed qualifying sessions, the sixteen fastest riders were admitted to the newly created Superpole, which determined the first four rows of the starting grid; during this session each rider went on the track in reverse qualifying order to take a single flying lap.

Ducati won the manufacturers' championship.

The season also saw Sentul (part of Indonesian Grand Prix) being dropped from 1998 calendar due to 1997 Asian Financial Crisis

Race calendar and results

Footnotes

Championship standings

Riders' standings

 Due to separate accidents, the first race in Laguna Seca was stopped on the 13th of the 28 scheduled laps and the subsequent restart was aborted; half points were awarded.

Manufacturers' standings

 Due to separate accidents, the first race in Laguna Seca was stopped on the 13th of the 28 scheduled laps and the subsequent restart was aborted; half points were awarded.

External links

References

Superbike World Championship
Superbike World Championship seasons